Purpose of the association EAIU - European Association for Intercultural Understanding is to promote education and the support of needy persons on the basis of a broad intercultural understanding.

This cross-cultural understanding also includes the following areas with a
 multicultural education,
 cross-cultural studies
 cross-cultural communication
 anti-racist education,
 human rights education,
 education for active citizenship,
 education and appreciation of people, regardless of age, gender, health status or sexual orientation.

The purpose is achieved in particular through the
 implementation of scientific events,
 conferences,
 seminars,
 teacher trainings,
 publications,
 research projects,
 through participation in international and intercultural projects and
 generally through the promotion of intercultural understanding in the various fields of education.

International: European Association for Intercultural Understanding
Deutschland: Europäische Vereinigung für Interkulturelle Verständigung
France: Association Européenne pour la Compréhension Interculturelle
Espangna: Asociación Europea para el Entendimiento Intercultural

Materials of the EAIU
Between 2008 and 2014 these materials have been developed:
 The Innocent Handbook (in English) made by the Innocent Project
 The Innocent-CD-ROM (in English, German, Spanish, Romanian and Italian)
 The Innocent-WBT (Web Based Training) in English, German, Spanish, Romanian and Italian.
 The Innocent-Teachers-Training-Course held in different countries. The expenses of these courses are paid by the European Commission after doing an application.
 The Self-Evaluation Handbook

Literature 
 Roland Schneidt, Mercedes Sole, Antonio Pacifico, Gabriela Iancu (Editor): Innocent Handbook. Verlag Ludwig Schulbuch, Reichertshausen 2008, Germany. 
 Roland Schneidt (Editor): Self-Evaluation Handbook. Verlag Ludwig Schulbuch, Reichertshausen 2012, Germany.

External links 
 Homepage of the EAIU
 Homepage of the INNOCENT-Project

Education in Europe